"Stay Awhile" is a song written by Ken Tobias, and was an international hit single for the Bells in 1971.

Personnel
 Jacki Ralph – lead vocals
 Cliff Edwards – lead vocals, harmonica
 Charlie Clark – guitar
 Mike Waye – bass
Frank Mills – piano
 Doug Gravelle – drums

Chart performance
In Canada, the song reached No. 1 on the "RPM 100", No. 1 on RPMs "MOR Playlist", and No. 1 on the CHUM 30 chart. In the United States, the song spent 14 weeks on the Billboard Hot 100 chart, peaking at No. 7, while reaching No. 8 on Billboards Easy Listening chart, and No. 4 on the Cash Box Top 100.

Weekly charts

Year-end charts

References

1971 songs
1971 singles
Polydor Records singles
RPM Top Singles number-one singles
Canadian soft rock songs